Vera Ordina (born 4 June 1968) is a Russian former hurdler. She finished fifth in the final of the 400 metres hurdles at the 1992 Barcelona Olympics, representing the Unified Team.

International competitions

References

External links

1968 births
Living people
Soviet female hurdlers
Russian female hurdlers
Olympic athletes of the Unified Team
Athletes (track and field) at the 1992 Summer Olympics
Place of birth missing (living people)